The Verein für Raumschiffahrt ("VfR") was a German amateur rocket association prior to World War II that included members outside Germany.  The first successful VfR test firing with liquid fuel (five minutes) was conducted by Max Valier at the Heylandt Works on January 25, 1930; and additional rocket experiments were conducted at a farm near Bernstadt, Saxony.

Space travel and rocketry gained popularity in Germany after the June 1923 publication of Herman Oberth's book Die Rakete zu den Planetenräumen and the expanded 1929 work Wege zur Raumschiffahrt (Ways to Spaceflight).

The VfR was founded in 1927 by Johannes Winkler, with Max Valier and Willy Ley after their participation as expert advisers for Fritz Lang's early science fiction film Frau im Mond (The Woman in the Moon). Ley and Hermann Oberth had hoped to receive funding from Lang for a real-life experimental rocket launch coinciding with the movie's premiere. Valier had assisted the Opel company in Fritz von Opel's demonstrations and speed records for cars, rail vehicles and the world's first rocket planes, Opel-RAK, which are generally considered the world's first rocket program. Those events drew large crowds and worldwide media attention and popularized rocketry as means of propulsion immensely. 

In September 1930, before Hitler came to power, the VfR requested funding from the German army. Rockets were one of the few types of military development not restricted by the Versailles treaty at the end of World War I, 11 years earlier. They received permission from the municipality to use an abandoned ammunition dump at Reinickendorf, the Berlin rocket launching site. For three years the VfR launched increasingly powerful rockets of their own design from this location. Following the unsuccessful Mirak rockets, the most powerful rocket of the Repulsor series (named for a spaceship in a German novel by Kurd Lasswitz) reached altitudes over 1 km (3,000 ft).

In the spring of 1932, Capt Walter Dornberger, his commander (Captain Ritter von Horstig), and Col Karl Heinrich Emil Becker viewed a (failed) VfR launch, and Dornberger subsequently issued a contract for a demonstration launch. Wernher von Braun, who was then a young student and had joined the group two years earlier, was in favor of the contract  The group eventually rejected the proposal and the dissension caused during its consideration contributed to the society dissolving itself in January 1934. The society's demise was also the result of an inability to find funding, and Berlin's civic authorities becoming concerned with rocketry experiments so close to the city.

The only known VfR rocket artifact is a rejected aluminium Repulsor nozzle which member Herbert Schaefer took to the US when he emigrated in 1935 and which he donated to the Smithsonian Institution in 1978.

References 

1927 establishments in Germany
1933 disestablishments in Germany
History of Wrocław
History of spaceflight
Scientific organizations established in 1927
Organizations disestablished in 1933